NIBS or Nibs may refer to:

National Institute of Building Sciences
Non-Invasive Brain Stimulation, noninvasive forms of neurostimulation
Non-invasive backscattering
Nib (pen)
Cacao nibs, pieces of roasted cocoa bean, generally ground into powder, but also inserted into chocolate bars to give additional "crunch"
Nibs, one of the Lost Boys in Peter Pan
A miniature variety of Twizzlers candy
NIBS Buses, bus operator in Essex, England

See also
 NIB (disambiguation)